Hirna (Oromo: Hirna)  a town Located in the West Hararghe Zone Of Oromia, Ethiopia it has a latitude and longitude of  and an altitude of 1763 meters above sea level. It is the larger of the two towns in Tulo woreda.

Overview
The town of Hirna is located on the main highway between Chiro and Haramaya in the Chercher Mountains. This follows an old caravan route between Shewa and Harar, which was in use during Arthur Rimbaud's residence at Harar. Telephone service came to this town between 1954 and 1968.

In response to king Menelik's orders to occupy the Cherchers, in November 1887 Dejazmach Wolde Gabriel marched forth with a mixed force of Amhara riflemen and Oromos, and set up camp at Hirna. According to Harold G. Marcus, his army "was in poor shape, reduced to a relatively small number by sickness and desertions." A night attack by Emir 'Abd Allah's army routed the Dejazmach's force, sending them fleeing westward towards the Awash River.

Notable local inhabitants include the artist Alemayehu Bizuneh (born 1934). He studied in France (1966–70), and Germany (1975–76) and later had a residency at the National Museum of Ethiopia in 1980. Hirna is also home city of former Deputy Prime minister of Ethiopia Addisu Legesse.

Demographics
Based on figures from the Central Statistical Agency, in 2005 Hirna has an estimated total population of 16,726, of whom 8,360 are men and 8,366 are women. The 1994 national census reported this town had a total population of 9,353 of whom 4,534 were men and 4,819 women.

References

Populated places in the Oromia Region